Seinnan or Sein Nan is a village and village tract in Hkamti Township in Hkamti District in the Sagaing Region of northwestern Burma. At the time of the 2014 census the village tract had a population of 1462 people of which 782 were men and 680 were women. 265 households were recorded.

References

External links
Maplandia World Gazetteer

Populated places in Hkamti District
Village tracts of Hkamti Township